The following is a list of ice rinks in New Zealand:

Indoor
Alexandra Curling Club, Alexandra, Otago
Alpine Ice Centre, Christchurch, Canterbury
Dunedin Ice Stadium, Dunedin, Otago
Frosty Spot Ice Rink, Upper Hutt, Wellington
Gore Multisports Complex, Gore, Southland
Maniototo International Curling Rink, Naseby, Otago
Paradice Avondale Ice Arena, Avondale, Auckland
Paradice Botany Downs Ice Arena, Botany Downs, Auckland
Queenstown Ice Arena, Queenstown, Otago

Outdoor (seasonal)
Idaburn Dam, Oturehua, Otago
Manorburn Dam, Alexandra, Otago
Queenstown Gardens Ice Rink, Queenstown, Otago
Staveley Ice Skating & Curling Rinks, Staveley, Canterbury

References

New Zealand
Sports venues in New Zealand